,  for short, is a municipal university in Japan. It is located in Gakuen-higashimachi, Nishi-ku, Kobe City.

History 
Kobe City was heavily damaged in World War II, and it founded the college to help restore the port city.

The college had five departments: English and American Studies, Russian Studies, Chinese Studies, Spanish Studies, and International Relations. The first campus was located in Daikai-dori, Hyogo-ku; the school buildings were those of Daikai Elementary School, which had few pupils at that time. In 1947 the college moved to Onogara-dori, Fukiai-ku (Chuo-ku now).

In April 1949 the college was developed into Kobe City University of Foreign Studies, a four-year university under Japan's new educational system. A new campus was opened on a hill called  in Nada-ku.

The latter history of KCUFS is as follows:
 1953: Evening courses (Department of English and American Studies) were added.
 1962: Department of Spanish Studies was added.
 1967: Master's courses were added.
 1986: KCUFS moved to present-day "Academic Town" Campus (in Nishi-ku).
The former Kusunoki-ga-oka Campus is now the campus of Shinwa Junior & Girls' Senior High School.
 1987: Department of International Relations was added.
 1996: Doctoral courses (International Cultural Studies) were added.

Undergraduate courses 
 Department of English and American Studies
 Department of Russian Studies
 Department of Chinese Studies
 Department of Spanish Studies
 Department of International Relations
 Evening Courses (Department of English and American Studies)

Graduate schools 
Master's courses
 Division of English Language Studies
 Division of Russian Language Studies
 Division of Chinese Language Studies
 Division of Spanish Language Studies
 Division of International Relations
 Division of Japanese and Asian Languages and Culture
 Division of English Education

Doctoral courses
 International Cultural Studies

Institutes 
 Academic Information Center (Library)
 Institute for Foreign Studies
 Institute for the professors
 Institute of the main office
 Institute for students (Cafeteria)

References

Further reading 
Kobe City University of Foreign Studies Brochure (2020), p. 38-39

External links 

 Official website

Public universities in Japan
Universities and colleges in Hyōgo Prefecture